Hasht Peyman (also Romanized as Hasht Peymān; also known as Hasht Mehmān) is a village in Emamzadeh Jafar Rural District, in the Central District of Gachsaran County, Kohgiluyeh and Boyer-Ahmad Province, Iran. At the 2006 census, its population was 65, in 13 families.

References 

Populated places in Gachsaran County